Hector Juan Samuel  "Tico" Torres  (born October 7, 1953) is an American musician, artist, and entrepreneur, best known as the drummer, percussionist, and a songwriter for American rock band Bon Jovi. In 2018, Torres was inducted into the Rock and Roll Hall of Fame as a member of Bon Jovi.

Childhood 
Hector Juan Samuel Torres was born on October 7, 1953, in New York City, and brought up in the Colonia section of Woodbridge Township, New Jersey. His parents, Emma and Héctor, emigrated from Cuba in 1948. Torres attended John F. Kennedy Memorial High School in Iselin.

Music career 

Torres was a jazz fan as a youth and studied music with Joe Morello. In 1969, he played drums for the psychedelic rock band Six Feet Under. Before joining Bon Jovi in 1983, Torres had already played live with Joe Cerisano's R-Band aka Silver Condor in the New Jersey Rock circuit, and in the studio with Franke and the Knockouts, Pat Benatar, Chuck Berry, Cher, Alice Cooper and Stevie Nicks, recording a total of 26 albums with these artists. Torres was also one of the drummers auditioned by Kiss in 1980 after original drummer Peter Criss left the band.

Torres was the original drummer for the glam rock band T. Roth and Another Pretty Face and played on their 1980 album Face Facts.

Bon Jovi

Torres met Alec John Such while playing with a band called Phantom's Opera and it was this friendship which led to him joining Bon Jovi. When Jon Bon Jovi, the lead singer of the band, approached Torres, he was put off by the fact that Jon was 9 years younger than he was. He said it was Jon's charismatic appearance and watching him perform that attracted him to join the band.

Torres is primarily a drummer and percussionist, but he sang lead vocals on a song on the box set 100,000,000 Bon Jovi Fans Can't Be Wrong, as well as backing vocals on a couple of the early Bon Jovi tracks, notably "Born to Be My Baby" and "Love for Sale".

Other work 
Known as "The Hitman," Torres discovered another talent: painting. He has exhibited his art since 1994. The successful first show was at the Ambassador Galleries in Soho, New York. Torres is a self-taught painter, who paints expressive pictures which show scenes from everyday life and his life with the band.

His painting talent was shown in one of the three videos made for the single "Who Says You Can't Go Home."

Torres also owns a fashion line for babies called Rock Star Baby.

Personal life 

Torres and his first wife divorced soon after the formation of Bon Jovi in 1983. In 1996, Torres married Czech-born model Eva Herzigová in Sea Bright, New Jersey. The ceremony was attended by their closest friends and family including Donald Trump and the members of Bon Jovi. The band serenaded Eva and her husband with the hit single "Always" during the dance. Their marriage ended two years later. Torres married Maria Alejandra in September 2001, his third marriage and divorced in 2008. They have a son, Hector Alexander, born on January 9, 2004. 

When the Bon Jovi What About Now tour reached Mexico on September 10, 2013, Torres experienced severe abdominal pains and was rushed to the hospital with appendicitis. About two weeks later, on September 22, 2013, he was hospitalized a second time for emergency gall bladder surgery. Rich Scanella filled in for him, and Torres returned to the tour in Fresno CA on October 8, 2013.

Torres is an avid golfer who frequently participates in the Alfred Dunhill Links Pro-Am in St. Andrews, UK, often playing in a foursome with fellow musician and good friend Huey Lewis.

Discography

Bon Jovi 

Studio albums

Bon Jovi (1984)
7800° Fahrenheit (1985)
Slippery When Wet  (1986)
New Jersey (1988)
Keep the Faith (1992)
These Days (1995)
Crush (2000)
Bounce (2002)
Have a Nice Day (2005)
Lost Highway (2007)
The Circle (2009)
What About Now (2013)
Burning Bridges (2015)
This House Is Not for Sale (2016)
2020 (2020)

Compilation albums

Hard & Hot (1991)
Cross Road (1994)
Tokyo Road: Best of Bon Jovi (2001)
This Left Feels Right (2003)
Greatest Hits (2010)

Live albums
One Wild Night Live 1985-2001 (2001)
Inside Out (2012)
This House Is Not for Sale – Live from the London Palladium (2016)

Box Sets
100,000,000 Bon Jovi Fans Can't Be Wrong (2004)

Richie Sambora 

Studio albums

Stranger in This Town (1991)

T. Roth and Another Pretty Face 
Face Facts (1980)

See also

 List of Cubans

References

External links

 Bon Jovi.com
 NPR Jon Bon Jovi profile
 Bon Jovi's Webpage at VH1
 Ten Classic Bon Jovi Songs at Unreality Music
 
 
 Tico Torres Art

1953 births		
20th-century American drummers		
American male drummers		
American people of Cuban descent		
American rock drummers		
Bon Jovi members		
Jersey Shore musicians		
Living people		
Musicians from New Jersey		
Musicians from New York (state)		
People from Woodbridge Township, New Jersey